Heinrich Leonhards Skuja (1892–1972) was a botanist specialist of algae.

Among the taxa he described is Achroonema, a genus of bacteria whose taxonomic placement is still uncertain.

Publications
 Skuja, H. (1926/28): Vorabeiten zu einer Algenflora von Lettland I–IV. – Acta Horti Botanici Universitatis Latviensis 1–3, Riga. Nachdruck: (Koeltz) Königstein.
 Skuja, H. (1932). Beitrag zur Algenflora Lettlands I. Acta Horti Bot Univ Latviensis 7: 25–85, .
 Skuja, H. (1938). Die phylogenetischen Entwicklungsrichtungen bei den Protisten. Acta Biol. Latvica, 8:1-26, .
 Skuja, H. (1939). Beitrag zur Algenflora Lettlands II. Acta Horti Bot Univ Latviensis 11/12: 41–169, .
 Skuja, H. (1948): Taxonomie des Phytoplanktons einiger Seen in Uppland, Schweden. 39 Taf. – Symbolae Botanicae Upsalienses. 9, 3: 1–399, Uppsala. Nachdruck: (Koeltz) Königstein, .
 Skuja, H. (1956): Taxonomische und biologische Studien über das Phytoplankton schwedischer Binnengewässer. 63 Taf. – Nova Acta Regiae Societatis Scientiarum Upsaliensis Ser. 4, 16, 3: 1–404, Uppsala. Nachdruck: (Koeltz) Königstein, .
 Skuja, H. (1964): Grundzüge der Algenflora und Algenvegetation der Fjeldgegenden um Abisko in Schwedisch-Lappland. 69 Taf. – Nova Acta Regiae Societatis Scientiarum Upsaliensis Ser. 4, 18, 3: 1–465, Uppsala. Nachdruck: (Koeltz) Königstein, .

References

External links 
 

Phycologists
1892 births
1972 deaths